Oleksiy Oleksiyovych Bykov (born 29 March 1998) is a Ukrainian professional footballer who plays as a centre-back for Zagłębie Sosnowiec, on loan from Mariupol.

Club career
He made his Ukrainian Premier League debut for Mariupol on 18 March 2018 in a game against FC Shakhtar Donetsk.

On 18 July 2022, he joined Polish I liga club Zagłębie Sosnowiec on a loan until the end of the season, with an option to buy.

References

External links
 
 

1998 births
People from Khartsyzk
Living people
Ukrainian footballers
Ukraine under-21 international footballers
Association football defenders
FC Shakhtar Donetsk players
FC Oleksandriya players
FC Mariupol players
PFC Lokomotiv Plovdiv players
Knattspyrnufélag Akureyrar players
Zagłębie Sosnowiec players
Ukrainian Premier League players
First Professional Football League (Bulgaria) players
Úrvalsdeild karla (football) players
Ukrainian expatriate footballers
Ukrainian expatriate sportspeople in Bulgaria
Expatriate footballers in Bulgaria
Ukrainian expatriate sportspeople in Iceland
Expatriate footballers in Iceland
Ukrainian expatriate sportspeople in Poland
Expatriate footballers in Poland
Sportspeople from Donetsk Oblast